The 1953 Stoke-on-Trent North by-election was held on 31 March 1953 after the incumbent Labour MP, Albert Davies, died on his way to Jamaica as member of a delegation from the Commonwealth Parliamentary Association. It was retained by the Labour candidate Harriet Slater, who had been a local councillor from 1933.

References

By-elections to the Parliament of the United Kingdom in Staffordshire constituencies
Politics of Stoke-on-Trent
1953 in England
1953 elections in the United Kingdom
20th century in Staffordshire
History of Stoke-on-Trent